Borchert Field was a baseball park in Milwaukee, Wisconsin, United States. The home field for several professional baseball clubs from 1888 through 1952, it became obsolete after the construction of County Stadium in 1953 and was demolished later that year. The site is now covered by Interstate 43.

The park was built on a rectangular block bounded by North 7th, North 8th, West Chambers, and West Burleigh Streets. Home plate was at the south end (Chambers), with the outfield bounded by the outer fence, making fair territory home-plate-shaped, with short fields in left and right and very deep power alleys, a configuration used by a number of ballparks of the era that were constrained by a narrow block.

Baseball
Originally known as Athletic Park, the park opened for baseball in May, 1888. During winter, it was flooded and served as an ice hockey rink. The ballfield replaced the Wright Street Grounds. (Podoll, p. 46)

The ballpark operated as the home of the Milwaukee Creams of the Western League, later renamed the Brewers. The Creams/Brewers played there through the 1894 season.

The ballfield was also sublet to the Milwaukee Brewers club of the major league American Association for the latter part of the 1891 season, replacing the disbanded Cincinnati Kelly's Killers. After the major league American Association merged into the National League in 1892, the Milwaukee franchise was discontinued.

An independent minor league named the American Association formed in 1902, including a new Milwaukee Brewers club. Meanwhile, another new minor league club, the Creams, began play in a new version of the Western League. The Creams retained the lease on the Lloyd Street property, so the Brewers re-opened their  ballpark, initially calling it Brewer Field, although the name Athletic Park endured until around 1920. Otto Borchert, son of Milwaukee brewing pioneer Frederick Borchert, purchased the field in 1920. The park thereafter became known as Borchert Field. Its original seating capacity was 4,800 (Pajot; 2009), but was later expanded to 10,000.

Because Milwaukee was too small to support two ballclubs, the Western League entry folded after 1903. The AA Brewers played for 51 seasons before being displaced by the major league Milwaukee Braves.

Athletic Park / Brewer Field was officially renamed Borchert Field at the start of the 1928 season in honor of previous owner Otto Borchert, who had died the previous year at a baseball dinner that was being broadcast live on the radio (Podoll, p. 218). During the 1920s, the ballpark had been unofficially dubbed "Borchert's Orchard" by the media (Podoll, p. 189).

Borchert Field was also home to the Milwaukee Bears, an entry in the Negro leagues, and the Milwaukee Chicks of the All-American Girls Professional Baseball League.  The Chicks won a pennant in their only year of operation. The venue hosted Games 3 and 4 of the 1937 Negro American League Championship Series, which matched the Kansas City Monarchs against the Chicago American Giants (the Monarchs won both games and the Series).

Lights and other obstructions
Experimental night games had been staged at Borchert from time to time, using portable lighting. The trend, especially in the minor leagues, was toward night games. Permanent lights were installed at Borchert in 1935, with the first Brewers night game being held on June 6. All of the light standards were mounted on the playing field, including a set of double poles near each corner, limiting the view of the field from some box seats.

The left and right field corners were so steep and close to the field that the only observers who could see the entire field were the players themselves, and the fans in the center field bleachers. After Lou Perini bought the Brewers, he had home plate and the infield moved about  toward center field. This allowed for placing bullpens in the left and right field corners, each team's pen on the opposite side of the field from their dugout so the coaching staff could watch them. It also had the effect of allowing fans to see more fair territory than they could previously.

Bill Veeck
One of the more colorful times for the stadium occurred during the early 1940s when Bill Veeck owned the team. The "PT Barnum of Baseball" brought an element of whimsy and marketing to the park, including fan giveaways of livestock, butter and vegetables, and staging morning games for third-shift wartime workers. According to his own autobiography, Veeck – As in Wreck, he claimed to have installed a screen to make the right field target a little more difficult for left-handed pull hitters of the opposing team. The screen was on wheels, so any given day it might be in place or not, depending on the batting strength of the opposing team.

There was no rule against that activity as such, so he got away with it, until one day when he took it to an extreme, rolling it out when the opponents batted, and reeling it back when the Brewers batted. Veeck reported that the league passed a rule against it the very next day. It has been speculated that the story was made up by Veeck; research by two members of the Society for American Baseball Research revealed no evidence of either a movable fence or any gear (pulleys, etc.) required for it to work. As early as 1944, newspapers were reporting on the story of the screens, though specifics have been elusive.

In that same book Veeck wrote: "Borchert Field, an architectural monstrosity, was so constructed that the fans on the first-base side of the grandstand couldn't see the right fielder, which seemed perfectly fair in that the fans on the third-base side couldn't see the left fielder. 'Listen,' I told them. 'This way you'll have to come back twice to see the whole team.'" Veeck's comments referred to the exceptionally high corners, which could theoretically hide the closest outfielder from a given spectator's view at times.

Football
The Milwaukee Badgers, who played in the National Football League from 1922 to 1926, staged their home games at Borchert Field.

Borchert Field was also the host to the first Green Bay Packers game held in Milwaukee, a 10–7 loss to the New York Giants on October 1, 1933. The Packers played games in Milwaukee at County Stadium starting in 1953 through 1994.

Later years

The ballpark suffered weather damage on June 15, 1944. During a game with Columbus, a windstorm pulled off the roof on the right side of the stands, sending debris flying and damaging some houses on 7th Street. The game was immediately stopped, ending in a tie. There were some serious injuries reported, but no known fatalities. That portion of the stands remained uncovered for the remaining years of the park's existence.

The final game at the ballpark came on September 21, 1952, a Brewers loss to the Kansas City Blues in the American Association playoffs.

Borchert Field was too small to accommodate Major League Baseball. Milwaukee civic leaders, seeking a major league franchise, built County Stadium to replace Borchert Field. It was intended that the Brewers would play in County Stadium in the 1953 season, but early that year their parent club, the Boston Braves, relocated to Milwaukee, so the final season of baseball at Borchert Field also turned out to be the last season of Brewers minor league baseball. The minor league franchise remained the Braves' top affiliate, moving to Toledo after the Mud Hens had moved the previous year, and were renamed the Toledo Glass Sox where they won the American Association pennant that same year.

After the stands were demolished, the field remained for some ten years as a recreational area. Later, the former site of the ballpark (and the entire block) became fully occupied by Interstate 43, Milwaukee's major north-south freeway, just north of exit 74 (Locust Street). Many of the houses on 7th and 8th streets facing the park still exist, now facing the highway, for which 7th and 8th are effectively frontage roads.

Dimensions

In 1947 home plate was moved approximately twenty feet north, farther away from the backstop and reducing the distance to center field.

Sources
The Minor League Milwaukee Brewers, by Brian A. Podoll, McFarland, 2003.
Ballparks of North America, by Michael Benson, McFarland, 1989.
Green Cathedrals by Phillip Lowry, Walker Books and SABR, 2006.
The Rise of Milwaukee Baseball, by Dennis Pajot, McFarland, 2009.

See also
 List of baseball parks in Milwaukee

References

External links
On Milwaukee article about Borchert Field
Greater Milwaukee Today history of Borchert Field.
Historical Marker Data Base – Borchert Field
A website about the old Brewers and Borchert Field

Defunct Major League Baseball venues
Defunct National Football League venues
American football venues in Wisconsin
Negro league baseball venues
Green Bay Packers stadiums
Sports venues in Milwaukee
Demolished sports venues in Wisconsin
Milwaukee Badgers
Defunct sports venues in Wisconsin
Sports venues completed in 1888
Sports venues demolished in 1953
1888 establishments in Wisconsin
1953 disestablishments in Wisconsin
Companies based in Milwaukee